Robert F. Colesberry Jr. (March 7, 1946 – February 9, 2004) was an American film and television producer, best known as a co-creator of the television series The Wire (2002–2008) for HBO, executive producer of the miniseries The Corner (2000), and a producer for Martin Scorsese's After Hours (1985), Alan Parker's Mississippi Burning (1988), and Billy Crystal's 61* (2001). Colesberry was also an occasional actor.

Early life
Colesberry was born in Philadelphia. Colesberry served as an artillery lieutenant in the Army in the mid-1960s. Colesberry also briefly played baseball and operated a bar in Wildwood, New Jersey.

Career
After being discharged from the Army, he attended Southern Connecticut State University, where he became interested in drama. He later transferred to New York University's Tisch School of the Arts, from which he received his B.F.A. in 1974.

Colesberry began working on films in New York. He was assistant director for Andy Warhol's Bad (1977) and first assistant director on Alan Parker's musical film Fame (1980). Colesberry was then a producer for Barry Levinson's The Natural (1984), and Martin Scorsese's black comedies The King of Comedy (1982) and After Hours (1985).

Colesberry received Oscar and Golden Globe nominations for his work on Parker's Mississippi Burning (1988) and Emmy nominations for 61* (2001) and the television movie Death of a Salesman (1985), based on the Arthur Miller play.

In 1999, Colesberry began his association with HBO as executive producer of The Corner (2000), a six-hour miniseries adaption of The Corner: A Year in the Life of an Inner-City Neighborhood, a nonfiction book by Baltimore Sun reporter David Simon and former Baltimore police detective Ed Burns. The show was nominated for four Primetime Emmys in 2000, winning two, including the Award for Outstanding Miniseries, and won a Peabody Award.

In 2000, Colesberry created the HBO series The Wire, written by Simon and Burns. Simon, Burns, Colesberry, and George Pelecanos were the "brain trust" of The Wire. Colesberry had a recurring cameo on the series as homicide detective Ray Cole.

Colesberry was posthumously awarded a Peabody Award for his work on The Wire in May 2004.

Personal life
In 1992, Colesberry was married to Karen L. Thorson; Thorson was also a filmmaker and producer on The Wire.

Colesberry was a longtime resident of both New York City and Amagansett, New York.

Death

Colesberry died in Manhattan at the age of 57 from complications following cardiac surgery on February 9, 2004. Following his death, the Robert F. Colesberry Scholarship Fund for young filmmakers was established in his honor at the NYU Tisch School. Colesberry was survived by his wife Karen L. Thorson; two sisters, Jean Brown and Christine Strittmatter; and 11 nephews and nieces.

Colesberry's death occurred soon after his directing debut on The Wire second-season finale, "Port in a Storm" (2003). The final episode of the fourth season, "Final Grades" (2006), and the series finale, "-30-" (2008), were dedicated to him. In episode three of the third season, "Dead Soldiers" (2004), Detective Cole (portrayed by Colesberry) dies off-screen (said to have died while exercising), and the episode depicts an emotional Irish wake for Detective Cole.

Filmography
He was a producer in all films unless otherwise noted.

Film

As an actor

Second unit director or assistant director

Production manager

Soundtrack

Miscellaneous crew

Location management

Thanks

Television

As an actor

Second unit director or assistant director

Production manager

Soundtrack

As director

Thanks

References

External links
 
 Robert F. Colesberry crew page at HBO's The Wire site
 Remembering Bob Colesberry at HBO's The Wire site

1946 births
2004 deaths
Southern Connecticut State University alumni
Tisch School of the Arts alumni
The Wire
United States Army officers
20th-century American male actors
Television personalities from Philadelphia
Television producers from New York (state)
American male television actors
American male film actors
21st-century American male actors
American television directors
American film producers
People from Amagansett, New York
Television producers from Pennsylvania
Unit production managers